The Historia monachorum in Aegypto, also called the Lives of the Desert Fathers, is a combination travelogue and hagiography from the late 4th century AD. It recounts the travels of a band of seven Palestinian monks on a pilgrimage through Egypt between September 394 and January 395. They travelled from south to north, stopping in monasteries and meeting hermits and holy men. The Historia is in essence a collection of stories about these men and their miracles.

The Historia is anonymous. It was originally written in Greek. It was early translated into Latin by Rufinus of Aquileia, who also added material of his own. It is best known by the Latin title of Rufinus' edition, which is often misleadingly translated "History of the Monks of Egypt", but the work is not historiography. It was one of the most popular hagiographical texts throughout the Middle Ages. Four distinct translations into Syriac are known, as are translations into Georgian, Slavonic, Armenian and Arabic. A Coptic translation is known only from fragments. There are critical editions of both the Greek and Latin texts.

The Greek Historia has a prologue, epilogue and 26 chapters:

John of Lycopolis
Or of Nitria
Ammon
Bes
Oxyrhynchus
Theon
Elias
Apollo of Hermopolis
Ammonas of Egypt
Copres and Patermuthius
Sourous
Helle
Apelles John
Paphnutius
Pitirim of Porphyry
Eulogius
Isidore
Sarapion of Egypt
Apollonius
Dioscorus and Nitria
Macarius of Egypt
Amun
Macarius of Alexandria
Paul the Simple
Piammonas
John

Notes

Bibliography

4th-century Christian texts
Christian hagiography
Greek literature (post-classical)